Ngobeni is a surname. Notable people with the surname include:

Clifford Ngobeni (born 1987), South African footballer
December Ngobeni (born 1975), South African footballer
Paul Ngobeni (born 1960), South African lawyer
Solomon Ngobeni (died 1989), South African murderer
Thela Ngobeni (born 1989), South African footballer